Got Back was a concert tour by English musician Paul McCartney, that started on 28 April 2022 and ended on 25 June 2022. The tour was McCartney's first following the COVID-19 pandemic that resulted in the cancellation of a planned European leg of his Freshen Up tour in 2020, which included a planned performance at Glastonbury Festival. McCartney performed at Glastonbury on Saturday 25 June 2022, as a conclusion to the Got Back tour.

The setlist for Got Back, as with McCartney's other concert tours as a solo artist, included songs by his former bands the Beatles and Wings, as well as songs from his solo career. In addition to McCartney, the tour band included Rusty Anderson on guitar, Brian Ray on guitar and bass, Paul "Wix" Wickens on keyboards, and Abe Laboriel Jr. on drums, along with the brass trio Hot City Horns. Originally planned for fourteen stops on the tour, a second date in both Oakland, California, and Boston were later added, for a total of sixteen concerts across the United States.

Background 
The Got Back tour was McCartney's first series of live shows since 2019. The COVID-19 pandemic resulted in the cancellation of the final European leg of his previous tour in 2020, which included a planned performance at Glastonbury Festival as the final show. During the pandemic in 2020, McCartney recorded and released his 18th solo album, McCartney III. In 2021, the three-part documentary series The Beatles: Get Back, directed and produced by Peter Jackson, was released on Disney+. The series covers the making of the album Let It Be by McCartney's former band The Beatles, utilizing footage and audio captured for a 1970 documentary film of the same name.

The dates for the Got Back tour were announced on 18 February 2022. The tour was originally planned to have fourteen stops. On 25 February 2022, it was announced that a second concert would be held at Fenway Park in Boston, Massachusetts, on 8 June, in addition to the already-announced concert on 7 June. On 11 March, it was then announced that the concert planned for 6 May at Oakland Arena in Oakland, California, would be followed by a second concert in the same venue on 8 May (Mother's Day), bringing the total number of planned stops on the tour to sixteen.

Following the conclusion of the North American leg of the tour, McCartney headlined at the Glastonbury Festival on 25 June, in a 160-minute set, with special guests Dave Grohl and Bruce Springsteen.

Overview

The setlist for the Got Back tour consisted of over 30 songs, including songs by The Beatles and Wings, as well as songs from McCartney's solo career. Each concert ran for around 2 hours and 40 minutes in length. The pre-show featured a scrolling video slide show of images of McCartney and the Beatles, culminating in an animated image of McCartney's Höfner bass.

The sixth song on the setlist was Wings' "Let Me Roll It", which segued into a snippet of "Foxy Lady" as a tribute to Jimi Hendrix. The ninth song on the setlist was "My Valentine", a song from McCartney's solo career, which was accompanied by a video of Natalie Portman and Johnny Depp gesturing in sign language. The 16th song on the setlist, The Beatles' "Blackbird", featured McCartney singing while playing acoustic guitar, elevated about six metres (20 feet) in the air, in front of a large LED display. "Blackbird" was followed by another acoustic performance, "Here Today", a song which McCartney wrote about his former Beatles bandmate John Lennon after Lennon's murder in 1980. The 22nd song on the setlist, the George Harrison-penned "Something", began with McCartney playing a ukulele which Harrison gave to him. The 28th song on the setlist, Wings' "Live and Let Die", involved the use of pyrotechnics, including flames and fireworks.

The Spokesman-Review and The Dallas Morning News noted the absence of The Beatles song "Back in the U.S.S.R.", a usual staple of McCartney's live concerts, from the setlist, in light of the 2022 Russian invasion of Ukraine. Immediately preceding the encore at each stop on the tour, McCartney and his fellow band members left the stage and each returned with a flag: the flag of Ukraine, the flag of the United Kingdom, the flag of the United States, and an LGBT pride flag, as well as the state flag of whichever state the concert took place in (for example, the flag of Texas at the show in Fort Worth, Texas, and the flag of Florida at the show in Hollywood, Florida).

The encore of the show was composed of The Beatles songs "I've Got a Feeling", "Birthday", "Helter Skelter", and "Golden Slumbers"/"Carry That Weight"/"The End". "I've Got a Feeling" was originally written and sung by McCartney and John Lennon and included on the Let It Be album. The performances of this song during the tour included a "video duet" between McCartney and Lennon, using footage restored for the Get Back documentary of Lennon performing the song with the Beatles during their 1969 rooftop concert. Jackson had isolated the vocals of Lennon after conceiving the idea of having Lennon "sing" along with McCartney and his live band; he told McCartney, "We can extract John's voice, and he can sing with you," to which McCartney replied, "Oh, yeah!"

On the final stop of the North American leg of the tour, on 16 June at MetLife Stadium in East Rutherford, New Jersey, McCartney was joined on stage during the concert by New Jersey-born musicians Bruce Springsteen and Jon Bon Jovi. Springsteen, with McCartney and McCartney's band, performed the Springsteen song "Glory Days", as well as the Beatles' "I Wanna Be Your Man". During the show's encore, Bon Jovi appeared on stage with balloons and sang "Happy Birthday" to McCartney, who turned 80 years old on 18 June. Springsteen returned during the final song, "The End", playing guitar.

Reception 
Reviewing the 13 May concert held at Inglewood, California's SoFi Stadium, Chris Willman of Variety commended McCartney's singing voice and made note of the show's structure: "a rocking opening stretch highly reliant on '70s rockers [...] a partially acoustic, 'Storytellers'-like magical history tour of the Beatles' rise as the backbone of Act 2, [...] and then, letting the third hour be birthday songs, na-na-na-na-na-na-na-ing and Abbey Road medley-izing. That structure indisputably works, and so, as part of a winning formula, does a band that has now been together for many more years than the Beatles ever were".

The Charlotte Observers Théoden Janes, reviewing the 21 May concert at Truist Field at Wake Forest in Winston-Salem, North Carolina, praised the show, calling the setlist "thoughtfully curated" and writing that "the entire night was one big nonstop highlight". However, they suggested that the production "skip the music video that plays during 'My Valentine, stating, "We want to think about someone we love during that song. Not about Depp and Amber Heard"; they also criticized the heavy traffic around the stadium and the management of it by stadium officials and local police.

Grant Albert of the Miami New Times, in a review of the 25 May concert held at Hollywood, Florida's Hard Rock Live, wrote that McCartney "can't hit the high notes like he used to. Still, his 60-plus year discography, showmanship, and influence didn't stop the nearly 7,000 attendees from enjoying the rock polymath perform"; he added, "McCartney injected loads of humor, visuals, lasers, and a genuine intention to put on a good show".

Reviewing the 7 June concert at Fenway Park in Boston, Massachusetts, Marc Hirsch of the Boston Herald noted "some small noticeable vulnerabilities from age" in McCartney's singing voice, "But it otherwise maintained its essential McCartneyness". Hirsh also wrote, "Eleven days shy of turning 80, he was spry and up for the endurance challenge of playing upward of 30 songs over the course of two hours and 40 minutes at the first of two sold-out shows."

Tour band

Additional musicians
Hot City Horns
 Mike Davis – trumpet
 Kenji Fenton – saxophone
 Paul Burton – trombone

Setlist

Standard setlist 

 "Can't Buy Me Love"
 "Junior's Farm"
 "Letting Go"
 "Got to Get You into My Life"
 "Come On to Me"
 "Let Me Roll It" (with "Foxy Lady" coda)
 "Getting Better"
 "Let 'Em In" or "Women and Wives"
 "My Valentine"
 "Nineteen Hundred and Eighty-Five"
 "Maybe I'm Amazed"
 "I've Just Seen a Face" or "We Can Work It Out"
 "In Spite of All the Danger"
 "Love Me Do"
 "Dance Tonight"
 "Blackbird"
 "Here Today"
 "New" or "Queenie Eye"
 "Lady Madonna"
 "Fuh You"
 "Jet" (added from 8 June)
 "Being for the Benefit of Mr. Kite!"
 "Something"
 "Ob-La-Di, Ob-La-Da"
 "You Never Give Me Your Money"
 "She Came In Through the Bathroom Window"
 "Get Back"
 "Band on the Run" 
 "Let It Be"
 "Live and Let Die"
 "Hey Jude"
Encore

"I've Got a Feeling" (virtual duet with John Lennon)
 "Birthday"
 "Helter Skelter"
 "Golden Slumbers"
 "Carry That Weight"
 "The End"

Tour dates

Image gallery

See also
 List of Paul McCartney concert tours

References

External links
  (archived 30 May 2022)

2022 concert tours
Paul McCartney concert tours